Solanum anguivi is a plant indigenous to non-arid parts of Africa, and is commonly known as forest bitterberry or African eggplant, although the latter term is most commonly associated with Solanum aethiopicum.

It is a traditional ethnomedicine in India.

References

anguivi